Dejan Košir (born 30 January 1973 in Jesenice, SR Slovenia), is a former Slovenian snowboarder.

Košir competed at 2002 and 2006 Winter Olympics. He won 11 races in the World cup, in parallel slalom and giant slalom. In 2003, Košir was awarded Slovenian Sportsman of the year.

References 

1973 births
Living people
Slovenian male snowboarders
Snowboarders at the 2006 Winter Olympics
Snowboarders at the 2002 Winter Olympics
Olympic snowboarders of Slovenia
Sportspeople from Jesenice, Jesenice